The women's 5000 meter at the 2019 KNSB Dutch Single Distance Championships took place in Heerenveen at the Thialf ice skating rink on Sunday 30 December 2018. Although this tournament was held in 2018, it was part of the 2018–2019 speed skating season.

There were 10 participants.

Title holder was Antoinette de Jong.

Result

Source:

References

Single Distance Championships
2019 Single Distance
World